FC Olimp-Dolgoprudny-2 was a Russian football team based in Dolgoprudny. It was the reserves club for FC Olimp-Dolgoprudny. After the parent club was promoted to the second-tier FNL for the 2021–22 season, the second team was licensed for the third-tier Russian FNL 2. The club was not licensed for the 2022–23 season. Most players moved to FC Kosmos Dolgoprudny.

References

Association football clubs established in 2021
Association football clubs disestablished in 2022
Defunct football clubs in Russia
Football in Moscow Oblast
2021 establishments in Russia
2022 disestablishments in Russia